Gunārs Priede (1928–2000) was a Latvian playwright, engineer and architect. He was originally a civil engineer for the Soviet government in Latvia who became the most important Latvian playwright of the Soviet era. He penned numerous dramas and comedies with lyrical, metaphorical and realist qualities, reflecting social conditions in Latvia at the time.

He was appointed Writers' Union of Drama Consultant (1958 - 1960), to Riga Film Studio (1960 - 1964), the Ministry of Culture (1964 - 1965), the Latvian Filmmakers Union Board as secretary (1965 - 1968), secretary of the Writers’ Union (1972 - 1974), secretary the Writers' Union Board (1974 - 1984), the Lenin and USSR State Prize Committee (1975 - 1989), and the Latvian Brethren Cemetery Committee (1989). He was awarded with the Order of Three Stars (IV class).

Plays
 Jaunākā brāļa vasara (1955)
 Lai arī rudens (1956)
 Normunda meitene (1958)
 Vikas pirmā balle (1960)
 Miks un Dzilna (1963)
 Tava labā slava (1965)
 Pa valzivju ceļu (1965)
 Trīspadsmitā (1966)
 Smaržo sēnes (1967)
 Otīlija un viņas bērnubērni (1971)
 Ugunskurs lejā pie stacijas (1972)
 Žagatas dziesma (1978)
 Vai mēs viņu pazīsim? (1980)
 Mācību trauksme (1980)
 Saniknotā slieka (1983)
 Filiāle (1983)
 Centrifūga (1985)
 Sniegotie kalni (1986)

References

1928 births
2000 deaths
Writers from Riga
Engineers from Riga
Communist Party of Latvia politicians
Members of the Supreme Soviet of the Latvian Soviet Socialist Republic, 1975–1980
Latvian dramatists and playwrights
20th-century dramatists and playwrights
20th-century engineers
University of Latvia alumni
People's Writers of the Latvian SSR
Recipients of the Order of the Red Banner of Labour
Recipients of the Order of Friendship of Peoples
Recipients of the Order of the Three Stars